The Cowan Tunnel, or Cumberland Mountain Tunnel, is a railroad tunnel near Cowan, Tennessee.

The strategically important tunnel, part of the rail linkage between the Midwestern United States and the Southeastern United States, played a vital role during the American Civil War. It was considered a major engineering feat at the time. It is still operational and owned by CSX Railroad. The tunnel was listed on the National Register of Historic Places in 1977.

History 
Construction on the tunnel began in 1849 and was completed in 1852 with the tracks completed in 1853. Work was undertaken by slaves, Irish immigrants, and local workers with Swiss engineers. The importance of the tunnel was recognized during the American Civil War with both sides fighting over but never destroying the tunnel. The use of the tunnel continues today with freight trains frequently running through it.

Gallery

Bibliography

References

Railway buildings and structures on the National Register of Historic Places in Tennessee
Railway tunnels on the National Register of Historic Places
Railroad tunnels in Tennessee
National Register of Historic Places in Franklin County, Tennessee